Diaphone eumela, the cherry spot or lily borer, is a moth of the family Noctuidae. It is found in Lesotho, Mozambique, Namibia, South Africa and Angola.

Like its relative, Brithys crini, this noctuid is found almost exclusively on plants of the families Amaryllidaceae and Liliaceae, and has been recorded feeding on Ornithogalum eckloni and Boophone disticha.

References

Moths described in 1782
Glottulinae
Lepidoptera of Angola
Insects of Lesotho
Lepidoptera of Mozambique
Lepidoptera of Namibia
Lepidoptera of South Africa
Moths of Sub-Saharan Africa